Northeast Georgia is a region of Georgia in the United States.  The northern part is also in the north Georgia mountains, while the southern part (east of metro Atlanta) is still hilly but much flatter in topography. Northeast Georgia is also served by the Asheville/Spartanburg/Greenville/Anderson market (Western North Carolina and Upstate South Carolina).

The mountainous part of the region contains the Georgia counties of:

 Banks
 Dawson
 Elbert
 Fannin
 Franklin
 Forsyth
 Gilmer
 Hall
 Hart
 Habersham
 Lumpkin
 Rabun
 Pickens
 Stephens
 Union
 Towns
 White

Cities in the region include Helen, Cleveland, Blairsville, Sautee Nacoochee, Clarkesville, Clayton, Dahlonega, Gainesville, Hiawassee, Young Harris,  and Toccoa in the northern section.  Elberton, Hartwell and Lavonia are located farther south. Gainesville is the largest city.

Northeast Georgia contains colleges such as Emmanuel College in Franklin Springs, Georgia, North Georgia Technical College in Clarkesville, Young Harris College in Young Harris, Truett-McConnell College in Cleveland, Toccoa Falls College in Toccoa, University of North Georgia (formerly North Georgia College and State University and Gainesville State College) in Dahlonega, and Brenau University in Gainesville.

Northeast Georgia is part of two media markets: Atlanta toward the southwest and Greenville/Spartanburg/Asheville to the northeast.

For weather warnings, the westernmost counties of the region are considered to be north-central Georgia by the National Weather Service in Atlanta (NWSFO Peachtree City).  The easternmost counties, bordering South Carolina in the Savannah River valley, are the responsibility of the Greenville/Spartanburg office (NWSFO Greer).

Besides the Savannah River, and its tributaries the Tugaloo River and Chattooga River (which also form the state line), the other major rivers are the Chattahoochee River and it's tributary the Chestatee River, which are the headwaters for much of metro Atlanta's water supply, held in Lake Lanier by Buford Dam.  The Oconee River also begins near Athens, and the Little Tennessee River flows north from Rabun county.

The Chattahoochee and Chestatee are west of the Eastern Continental Divide along with Little Tennessee, while the others are east.  The divide bisects northeast Georgia, running from near the northeastern tip down to the city of Atlanta.

 
Regions of Georgia (U.S. state)
Geography of Appalachia